Iron Sky: Invasion is an official video game expansion of the 2012 Finnish science fiction comedy Iron Sky. The game is developed by Reality Pump Studios, and is published by TopWare Interactive.

Iron Sky: Invasion is a space fighter simulator, enhanced with strategic and RPG elements, set in the universe of Iron Sky and expanding upon its foundations. The core of the gameplay is based on ship-to-ship dogfights, combined with assaults on giant spaceships (such as the space Zeppelins, portrayed in the film), as well as tactical thinking and resource management.

The game was first announced on August 19, 2012, by the video game publisher TopWare Interactive, during the Gamescom trade fair in Cologne, Germany. It was released in Europe on December 12, 2012, for the Windows, Xbox 360, PlayStation 3, iOS, Android and Mac OS platforms. It has received mixed or negative reviews from critics.

Gameplay
The game takes place in outer space, where the players must defend the Earth from the invasion of the Moon Nazis, as depicted in the 2012 film. The players can control most of the spaceships from the movie, to freely roam the space and attack Nazi vessels. There are weapons and equipment at their disposal, from offensive systems to defensive drones and satellites. The vessels are also equipped with military countermeasures which protect them from enemy fire, and can be recharged, upgraded or traded for other models. Upgrades require special resources, which can be scavenged from destroyed enemy units or found in outer space. A tactical space map can be used to spot the positions of Nazi forces or ongoing battles, with the destruction of the secret Nazi base hidden on the Dark Side of the Moon set as the ultimate goal.

See also
Nazi UFOs

References

External links
Iron Sky: Invasion Facebook page
Official game website
The Hollywood Reporter press release on the game

2012 video games
Alternate history video games
Android (operating system) games
IOS games
MacOS games
Nazis in fiction
Video games about Nazi Germany
PlayStation 3 games
Science fiction video games
Space combat simulators
Video games developed in Poland
Windows games
Video games about World War II alternate histories
World War III video games
Xbox 360 games
Video games based on films
Works based on Finnish works
Video games set in 2018
TopWare Interactive games
Single-player video games